Vogl is a surname. Notable people with the surname include:

Alois Vogl (born 1972), German alpine skier
Donald George Vogl (born 1929), American artist and academic
Emerich Vogl (1905–1971), Romanian footballer and manager
Heinrich Vogl (1845–1900), German opera singer
Johann Michael Vogl (1768–1840), Austrian opera singer and composer
Joseph Vogl (born 1957), German philosopher
Julia Vogl (born 1985), American artist
Otto Vogl (born 1927), American chemist
Sylvia Vogl (born 1974), Austrian yacht racer
Therese Vogl (1845–1921), German opera singer
Thomas Vogl (born 1958), German radiologist

See also
Vogel (surname)

Surnames from nicknames